Corticorelin (INN, trade name Xerecept) is a diagnostic agent. It is a synthetic form of human corticotropin-releasing hormone (hCRH).

Medical uses
The corticorelin stimulation test helps to differentiate between the causes for adrenocorticotropic hormone (ACTH)-dependent hypercortisolism. It is used to distinguish a pituitary source of excessive ACTH secretion from a different source.

 If corticorelin injection increases plasma levels of ACTH and cortisol, a diagnosis of Cushing's disease is achieved (ACTH of pituitary origin).
 If corticorelin injection leads to little or no response in plasma levels of ACTH or cortisol, a diagnosis of ectopic ACTH syndrome is confirmed.

Side effects
The most common side effects (in 1% to 10% of patients) are transient dysosmia and dysgeusia (distortion of the sense of smell and taste), as well as a sensation of warmth. About 0.1 to 1% of patients experience hypersensitivity, hypotension (lowering of blood pressure), tachycardia (increased heart rate), flush, dyspnoea (breathing difficulties), a cold sensation in the throat, the urge to urinate, and dizziness. Pituitary apoplexy has been reported in patients with pituitary tumours.

Interactions
The effects of corticorelin are reduced by corticosteroids, antihistamines, antiserotonergics and oxytocin. They are amplified by vasopressin and its analogues.

See also
 ACTH stimulation test
 Dexamethasone suppression test
 Metyrapone
 Pituitary-adrenal axis
 Tetracosactide

References

Corticotropin-releasing hormone
Corticotropin-releasing hormone receptor agonists
Peptides
World Anti-Doping Agency prohibited substances